Henry Lindlahr (March 1, 1862 – March 26, 1924) was the author of one of the cornerstone texts of American naturopathic medicine, Nature Cure, which includes topics about disease suppression versus elimination, hydrotherapy, and the importance of fresh air and sun bathing.

Career

Lindlahr was born March 1, 1862, in Cologne, Germany. He devoted himself to healing after being helped by Father Sebastian Kneipp (1821–1897), in Europe. Lindlahr was also influenced by the ideas of Bernarr Macfadden. He graduated from the National Medical University in Illinois. In 1902, he opened his practice in Chicago. In 1914, he founded the Lindlahr Sanitarium, in Elmhurst, Illinois.

Lindlahr and his institute were criticized by medical health experts for peddling quackery. For example, Lindlahr was advocate of "Iridiagnosis", a method alleged to diagnosis any disease by examining the eye alone. He also claimed that vaccination was worthless against smallpox and was the cause of cancer, tuberculosis and insanity.

Physician Morris Fishbein noted that "the methods of diagnosis used in the Lindlahr institution were preposterous, the methods of treatment varied and ridiculous." These included dubious treatments such as chiropractic, homeopathy, osteopathy and "strange" diets. He died in Chicago on March 26, 1924.

Publications
 reprint General Books LLC, 2009, 
; reprint Kessinger Publishing, 2004, 
 reprint Kessinger Publishing, 2004, 
 reprint Kessinger Publishing, 2004,

References

External links

"Nature Cure" , Soil and Health Library

1862 births
1924 deaths
American anti-vaccination activists
Naturopaths
People from Cologne
Pseudoscientific diet advocates
German emigrants to the United States